Artūras Dubonis  (July 23, 1962 in Vilnius) is a Lithuanian historian, Doctor of Humanities, who works for the Lithuanian Institute of History. His main research interests are: Lithuanian Metrica research and publishing, Lithuanian history sources, Lithuanian society in the 13th – 16th centuries, Lithuanian foreign policy in the 13th century and the first half of the 14th century.

References

1962 births
Living people
20th-century Lithuanian historians
Vilnius University alumni
21st-century Lithuanian historians
Lithuanian male writers
People from Vilnius
20th-century male writers